is a Japanese racing driver. He currently drives in the Super GT series in the GT300 category.

In 2008 he won the GT300 class in the Super GT championship, co-driving with Kazuki Hoshino. In 2009 he made his full season debut in the GT500 class in the Super GT series.

Racing record

Complete Super GT results
(key) (Races in bold indicate pole position) (Races in italics indicate fastest lap)

Complete Formula Nippon/Super Formula results
(key) (Races in bold indicate pole position) (Races in italics indicate fastest lap)

External links
Official website
driverdb
SUPERGT Official website

1983 births
Living people
Japanese racing drivers
Japanese Formula 3 Championship drivers
Formula Nippon drivers
Super GT drivers
Super Formula drivers
Formula Challenge Japan drivers
Nismo drivers
Kondō Racing drivers